The Assembly of the Republic (Portuguese: Assembleia da República), commonly referred to as simply Parliament (Portuguese: Parlamento), is the unicameral parliament of Portugal. According to the Constitution of Portugal, the parliament "is the representative assembly of all Portuguese citizens". The constitution names the assembly as one of the country's organs of supreme authority.

It is located in a historical building in Lisbon, referred to as Palácio de São Bento (Palace of Saint Benedict), the site of an old Benedictine monastery. The Palácio de São Bento has been the seat of the Portuguese parliaments since 1834 (Cortes until 1910, Congress from 1911 to 1926 and National Assembly from 1933 to 1974).

Powers and duties of the Assembly
The Assembly of the Republic's powers derive from its ability to dismiss a government through a vote of no confidence, to change the country's laws, and to amend the constitution (which requires a majority of two-thirds). In addition to these key powers, the constitution grants to the Assembly extensive legislative powers and substantial control over the budget, the right to authorize the government to raise taxes and grant loans, the power to ratify treaties and other kinds of international agreements, and the duty to approve or reject decisions by the President of the Republic to declare war and make peace. The assembly also appoints many members of important state institutions, such as ten of the thirteen members of the Constitutional Court and seven of the sixteen members of the Council of State.

The constitution requires the assembly to quickly review and approve an incoming government's program. Parliamentary rules allow the assembly to call for committees of inquiry to examine the government's actions. Political opposition represented in the assembly has the power to review the cabinet's actions, even though it is unlikely that the actions can be reversed. Party groups can also call for interpellations that require debates about specific government policies.

Structure
The assembly originally consisted of 250 MPs, but the constitutional reforms of 1989 reduced its number to between 180 and 230. Members are elected by popular vote for legislative terms of four years from the country's twenty-two constituencies. There are eighteen in mainland Portugal corresponding to each district, one each for the autonomous regions of Azores (Portuguese: Açores) and Madeira, and two for Portuguese people living abroad (one covering Europe and one covering the rest of the world). Except for the constituencies for Portuguese living abroad, which are fixed at two representatives each, the number of MPs is determined by the number of voters registered in a constituency, using the D'Hondt method of proportional representation. Constituencies vary greatly in size; from as large as the district of Lisbon, which returns 48 representatives, to as small as the district of Portalegre, which elects just two.

For the 2022 legislative elections, the MPs distributed by districts were as follows:

According to the constitution, members of the assembly represent the entire country, not the constituency from which they are elected. This directive has been reinforced in practice by the strong role of political parties in regard to members of the assembly. Party leadership, for example, determines in which areas candidates are to run for office, thus often weakening members' ties to their constituencies. Moreover, members of the assembly are expected to vote with their party and to work within parliamentary groups based on party membership. Party discipline is strong, and insubordinate members can be coerced through a variety of means. A further obstacle to members' independence is that their bills first have to be submitted to the parliamentary groups, and it is these groups' leaders who set the assembly's agenda.

The President of the Assembly of the Republic is the second hierarchical figure in the Portuguese state, after the President of the Portuguese Republic, and is elected by secret vote of the members of parliament. The President of the Assembly is aided by four vice presidents, nominated by the other parties represented in the parliament, and is usually the speaker. When they are not present, one of the vice presidents takes the role of speaker. When the President of the Republic is, for any reason, unable to perform the job, the President of the Assembly of the Republic becomes the substitute.

Current composition

Latest election result

Elected Composition of the Assembly of the Republic since 1975

Evolution graphic

Presidents of the Assembly of the Republic

See also
São Bento Palace
ARtv (Portugal)

Notes

References

External links

 

 
Portugal
Government of Portugal
Unicameral legislatures
Portugal